Oulton College is a Canadian private college situated in Moncton, New Brunswick. The college offers programs in four faculties: Business, Health Science, Human Services and Information Technology.

History

Foundation and early years
Gordon A. Oulton founded Oulton’s Business College in 1956, after having spent the previous 19 years as an Instructor and Principal at Robinson Business College in Moncton. Oulton’s goal was to run a progressive business college catering to the business needs of the day by offering training in Accounting, Stenography, Short Hand, Manual Typing, Business Machines, and Letter Writing. In its first year of operation the College had approximately 80 students and six staff members.  Oulton's Business College was first located at 599 Main Street in the Humphrey Block of downtown Moncton.

At the age of 18, Donald Fontaine began teaching at the College and was one of the original staff members. Along with his teaching responsibilities, he later accepted the position of Vice-Principal. After 27 years of service Fontaine was given ownership of the College in 1983. At that time, the College continued to offer business training and numbered approximately 230 students with 10 staff members.

In 1987, as original staff members were preparing for retirement and major changes in curriculum were being implemented due to the arrival of modern computers, Fontaine decided to sell the College to James Denton, but remained at the College as an Instructor and Principal. Additional programs were offered in such fields as Travel & Tourism, Medical Office Administration, Banking, and Paralegal. That year the College moved from its original location on Main Street to a more spacious building at 107 Robinson Street in downtown Moncton.

Due to family health reasons, Denton decided to move to Phoenix, Arizona in 1994. In the mid 1990s, courses in Computer Programming and networking were introduced in order to meet the demands of a growing Information Technology Industry. During this period the College witnessed a change in name from Oulton’s Business College to Oulton College. In 2001, the College moved to a larger facility located at 55 Lutz Street in downtown Moncton where new programs began to be offered in Policing & Corrections, Child & Youth Care, Pharmacy Technician, Veterinary Technician, Dental Assistant, Early Childhood Education, and Dental Hygiene. In 2007, a separate dental clinic opened on Pacific Avenue, which houses the Dental Hygiene and Dental Assistant students, as well as offering cleanings at a discounted rate to the public.

Present day
In 2011 the College began construction on the new state-of-the-art Flanders Court campus in Moncton. The Flanders Court campus, which welcomed students in September 2012, replaced classes located in downtown Moncton and the head office on Lutz Street. The College's Dental Education Centre still operates at the Pacific Avenue campus. Today, the enrollment has grown from an initial first class of 80 students studying accounting, stenography and other business skills, to a student population of over 715 spread across the faculties of Business, Health Sciences, Human Services and Information & Technology. The College operates with a faculty and administration team of over 80.

Recent program additions include Licensed Practical Nurse, Paramedic. and the first Optician program in Atlantic Canada.

Faculties and programs
Oulton College offers over 20 programs in four faculties. Administrative offices and most classes are located in the Flanders Court campus, however students in the dental program study at the Dental Education Centre located on Pacific Avenue. 
 Faculty of Business
 Business Management
 Sales, Marketing & Business Development
 Paralegal / Legal
 Travel & Hospitality
 Faculty of Health Sciences
 Dental Assistant
 Dental Hygiene
 Health Care Support
 Licensed Practical Nursing
 Medical Laboratory Assistant
 Medical Office Administration
 Optician
 Pharmacy Technician
 Primary Care Paramedic
 Veterinary Assistant
 Veterinary Technician
 Faculty of Human Services
 Child & Youth Care
 Early Childhood Education & Educational Assistant
 Human Services Counselor
 Policing & Corrections
 Faculty of Information & Technology
 Web and Mobile Development
 System Management and Cyber Security

References

External links 
 

Business schools in Canada
Technical universities and colleges in Canada
Education in Moncton
Colleges in New Brunswick
Buildings and structures in Moncton
Educational institutions established in 1956
1956 establishments in New Brunswick